James Madison Goodhue (1810–1852) was an American journalist, newspaper editor, and founder of the Minnesota Pioneer, Minnesota's first newspaper, which eventually merged with the Saint Paul Dispatch to become the Twin Cities Pioneer Press. He is the namesake of Goodhue County and is also known for being a founding member the first Masonic lodge in Minnesota, now known as St. Paul Lodge #3. 

Goodhue was born in Hebron, New Hampshire, and attended Amherst College, from which he graduated in 1832, after studying geology under Edward Hitchcock. Although he studied law and briefly practiced as a lawyer, in 1844 he found himself drawn to the newspaper industry after successfully serving as temporary editor of the Grant County Herald in Lancaster, Wisconsin, when the former editor left abruptly. Goodhue moved to Minnesota after President Polk declared it a territory in 1849, and settled in Saint Paul. The first issue of the Minnesota Pioneer was published on April 28, 1849, ten days after his arrival, making it the first newspaper in the territory. He set up an office for the newspaper in downtown St. Paul and successfully campaigned to become the territorial printer. He wrote passionately about Minnesota and encouraged others to move out West, but also harshly criticized those with whom he disagreed, so much so that he was stabbed by the irate brother of an rival editor in 1851. Goodhue was heavily involved in reporting on the Treaty of Traverse des Sioux for several months in 1851, and enthusiastically supported acquiring Sioux lands for white settlement. 

In 1850, Goodhue was named the first overseer of the Ramsey County Poor Farm, and was paid $20 annually for that work. 

Goodhue died in August 1852. While it is unclear exactly what caused his death, contemporary sources claimed he died partially of exhaustion after nearly drowning after falling off a ferry into a river, and partially of mental strain from his work.

References 

1810 births
1852 deaths

Amherst College alumni
People from Hebron, New Hampshire